Ömer Kandemir (born 3 July 1993) is a Turkish footballer who plays as a right back for TFF Second League club Isparta 32 Spor.

Professional career
A youth international of Fenerbahçe, Kandemir joined Denizlispor in the TFF Second League. On 1 January 2013, Kandemir joined Denizlispor from Giresunspor. Kandemir made his professional debut for Antalyaspor in a 3-2 Süper Lig win over İstanbul Başakşehir F.K. on 15 August 2015.

On 30 June 2017, Kandemir joined Kayserispor. On 13 September 2017, he joined Samsunspor until June 2018. He ended his loan early, and on 31 January 2018 joined Adana Demirspor.

References

External links

1993 births
Footballers from İzmir
Living people
Turkish footballers
Turkey youth international footballers
Association football fullbacks
Giresunspor footballers
Denizlispor footballers
Antalyaspor footballers
Karşıyaka S.K. footballers
Bandırmaspor footballers
Kayserispor footballers
Samsunspor footballers
Adana Demirspor footballers
Altınordu F.K. players
Niğde Anadolu FK footballers
Tokatspor footballers
Manisa FK footballers
Pendikspor footballers
Süper Lig players
TFF Second League players
TFF First League players